Scott-Lucas House is a historic home located at Morocco, Newton County, Indiana.  It was built in 1912, and is a -story, square, Bungalow / American Craftsman style brick dwelling.  It features wood clapboard siding, half-timbering and stucco, and steeply pitched side-gable roof with dormer. It was restored in 2000 and is open as a house museum owned by the Newton County Historical Society.

It was listed on the National Register of Historic Places in 2003.

References

External links
The Newcomer, Winter 2000

Historic house museums in Indiana
Houses on the National Register of Historic Places in Indiana
Bungalow architecture in Indiana
Houses completed in 1912
Buildings and structures in Newton County, Indiana
National Register of Historic Places in Newton County, Indiana